Cumberland is a village in Guernsey County, Ohio, United States. It is seventy miles east of Columbus. The population was 367 at the 2010 census.

History
Cumberland was platted in 1828. The village most likely was named after the Cumberland Road. A post office has been in operation at Cumberland since 1829.

School
The Cumberland School, which housed both elementary and high school classes during its many years of service, was completed in 1931 and is located at 359 North Cambridge Street. At the time of its construction, it cost $60,000 to build. The Class of 1964 was the last group of students to graduate from the school. Consolidation would take the upper classes out of the building. The structure would be used as an elementary until December 1, 1986, when it was closed for good. As of May 2022, the building is still standing.

Geography
Cumberland is located at  (39.852371, -81.658481).

Demographics

2010 census
As of the census of 2010, there were 367 people, 132 households, and 101 families living in the village. The racial makeup of the village was 94.3% White, 2.2% African American, 0.3% Asian, 1.1% from other races, and 2.2% from two or more races. Hispanic or Latino of any race were 1.6% of the population.

There were 132 households, of which 38.6% had children under the age of 18 living with them, 55.3% were married couples living together, 12.9% had a female householder with no husband present, 8.3% had a male householder with no wife present, and 23.5% were non-families. 17.4% of all households were made up of individuals, and 7.6% had someone living alone who was 65 years of age or older. The average household size was 2.78 and the average family size was 3.04.

The median age in the village was 37.6 years. 25.3% of residents were under the age of 18; 9% were between the ages of 18 and 24; 27.5% were from 25 to 44; 23.7% were from 45 to 64; and 14.4% were 65 years of age or older. The gender makeup of the village was 49.0% male and 51.0% female.

2000 census
As of the census of 2000, there were 402 people, 145 households, and 109 families living in the village. The population density was 832.0 people per square mile (323.4/km2). There were 162 housing units at an average density of 335.3 per square mile (130.3/km2). The racial makeup of the village was 99.00% White, 0.50% African American, 0.25% from other races, and 0.25% from two or more races.

There were 145 households, out of which 42.8% had children under the age of 18 living with them, 56.6% were married couples living together, 9.7% had a female householder with no husband present, and 24.8% were non-families. 22.8% of all households were made up of individuals, and 13.1% had someone living alone who was 65 years of age or older. The average household size was 2.77 and the average family size was 3.20.

In the village, the population was spread out, with 32.3% under the age of 18, 6.2% from 18 to 24, 30.8% from 25 to 44, 19.9% from 45 to 64, and 10.7% who were 65 years of age or older. The median age was 34 years. For every 100 females there were 104.1 males. For every 100 females age 18 and over, there were 91.5 males.

The median income for a household in the village was $29,792, and the median income for a family was $30,714. Males had a median income of $25,385 versus $16,500 for females. The per capita income for the village was $11,003. About 14.3% of families and 20.1% of the population were below the poverty line, including 27.7% of those under age 18 and 4.9% of those age 65 or over.

References

Villages in Guernsey County, Ohio
Villages in Ohio